Roch Marc Christian Kaboré (born 25 April 1957) is a Burkinabé banker and politician who served as the President of Burkina Faso from 2015 until he was deposed in 2022. He was the Prime Minister of Burkina Faso between 1994 and 1996 and President of the National Assembly of Burkina Faso from 2002 to 2012. Kaboré was also president of the Congress for Democracy and Progress (CDP) until his departure from the party in 2014. He founded the People's Movement for Progress party that same year.

Kaboré was elected president in the November 2015 general election, winning a majority in the first round of voting. Upon taking office, he became the first non-interim president in 49 years without any past ties to the military. Kaboré worked as a banker prior to his political career.

On 24 January 2022, during a coup d'état, Kaboré was deposed and detained by the military. After the announcement, the military declared that the parliament, government and constitution had been dissolved.

Early years
Kaboré was born in Ouagadougou, the capital city of Burkina Faso, then called Upper Volta. He is the son of Charles Bila Kaboré, former government minister and former Deputy Governor of the Central Bank of West African States (BCEAO). He attended primary school from 1962 to 1968, when he received his CPS (Certificate of Primary School). On completing this basic education certificate, he attended the Collège Saint Jean-Baptiste de la Salle, a selective school in Ouagadougou. He studied there from 1968 to 1975, passing his BEPC or General Certificate ('O' Level) in 1972 and his baccalauréat ('A' level) in 1975. He went on to study economics at the University of Dijon, majoring in business administration. There, he completed his BA in 1979 and his Master's in 1980.

Kaboré met his future wife, Sika Bella Kaboré, while both were studying in France. The couple married in 1982 and have three children.

Career

Banking career
Kaboré, like his father, Charles Bila Kaboré (who was a government minister under President Maurice Yaméogo), worked as a banker for the International Bank of Burkina (BIB). He was eventually promoted to head Burkina Faso's largest bank during the presidency of Thomas Sankara.  In 1984, aged 27, he was named the General Director of the BIB; he remained in that post until September 1989, when he was appointed to the government.

Political career
He was in the government as a minister and a special adviser to the president and has been a deputy in the National Assembly. He became Prime Minister in 1994.  When the Congress for Democracy and Progress was formed in early February 1996, Kaboré resigned as Prime Minister and became the new ruling party's First Vice-President, as well as Special Adviser at the Presidency.

On 6 June 2002, he was elected as President of the National Assembly of Burkina Faso, succeeding Mélégué Maurice Traoré.

In the May 2007 parliamentary election, Kaboré was re-elected to the National Assembly as the first candidate on the CDP's national list. Following the election, the National Assembly again elected Kaboré as its president. He received 90 votes, while Norbert Tiendrébéogo received 13; there were seven invalid votes.

Resignation from the CDP
Kaboré, along with a number of other prominent figures in the CDP, announced his resignation from the party on 6 January 2014. Those who resigned said that the party was being run in an undemocratic and damaging manner, and they expressed opposition to plans to amend the constitution to eliminate term limits, which would allow President Blaise Compaoré to stand for re-election in 2015. On 25 January 2014, a new opposition party led by Kaboré, the People's Movement for Progress (Mouvement du Peuple pour le Progrès, MPP), was founded.

Presidency
At an MPP convention held at the Ouagadougou Palais des Sports on 4–5 July 2015, Kaboré was officially confirmed as the MPP candidate for the presidential elections due to be held on 29 November 2015.

In the election of 29 November 2015, Kaboré won the election in the first round of voting, receiving 53.5% of the vote against 29.7% for the second place candidate, Zephirin Diabré. He was sworn in as President on 29 December 2015. He appointed Paul Kaba Thieba, an economist, as Prime Minister on 7 January 2016. The composition of the new government was announced on 13 January, with Kaboré personally taking charge of the ministerial portfolio for defense and veteran affairs. Jean-Claude Bouda, who had been Minister of Youth, was appointed on 20 February 2017 to take over from Kaboré as Minister of Defense.

He was reelected to a second term in the 22 November 2020 general elections with 57.74% of the vote.

Deposal and arrest
On 24 January 2022, Kaboré was deposed by the military. After the announcement, the military declared that the parliament, government, and constitution had been dissolved. The Patriotic Movement for Safeguard and Restoration (MPSR) shared a hand-written resignation letter by him, which was also signed, with its authenticity being verified by Reuters. "In the interests of the nation, following events that took place since yesterday, I have decided to resign from my role as president of Burkina Faso," said the letter. It was afterwards reported that Kaboré had been detained at a military barracks. He was later transferred to house arrest.

References

External links

|-

|-

1957 births
Living people
Burkinabé bankers
20th-century Burkinabé people
21st-century Burkinabé people
Congress for Democracy and Progress politicians
Heads of state of Burkina Faso
People from Ouagadougou
Presidents of the National Assembly of Burkina Faso
Prime Ministers of Burkina Faso
Ministers of Finance of Burkina Faso
University of Burgundy alumni
Leaders ousted by a coup